Juan Alfredo Azrube (June 1, 1918 – December 27, 2007) was a Roman Catholic bishop.

Born in Guayaquil, Ecuador, Arzube was ordained a priest for the Roman Catholic Archdiocese of Los Angeles on May 5, 1954. On February 9, 1971, he was appointed titular bishop of 'Civitate' and auxiliary bishop of the Los Angeles Archdiocese on February 9, 1971, and was ordained on March 25, 1971. He retired on September 7, 1993.

Juan Alfredo Azrube was listed in the Archdiocese of Los Angeles

Sexual Abuse Accusation 
In 2003, it was alleged that Auxiliary Bishop Arzube sexually abused an 11-year-old boy in approximately 1975 to 1976 while working at St. Alphonsus Catholic Church in East Los Angeles. Bishop Arzube denied the allegation. In 2007 as part of a massive settlement with survivors of child sexual abuse, the Archdiocese of Los Angeles settled a civil lawsuit naming Bishop Arzube. Bishop Arzube was included in the Archdiocese of Los Angeles’ list of priests accused of sexual misconduct involving minors.

Notes

1918 births
2007 deaths
People from Guayaquil
 
1975 scandals
Violence against men in North America
Ecuadorian emigrants to the United States
20th-century Roman Catholic bishops in the United States
Incidents of violence against boys
1976 scandals